James Edward Fleet (born 11 March 1952) is an English actor of theatre, radio and screen. He is most famous for his roles as the bumbling and well-meaning Tom in the 1994 British romantic comedy film Four Weddings and a Funeral and the dim-witted but kind hearted Hugo Horton in the BBC sitcom television series The Vicar of Dibley.

Early life
Fleet was born in Bilston, Staffordshire, to a Scottish mother, Christine, and an English father, Jim. He lived in Bilston until he was 10 but, when his father died, he moved to Aberdeenshire with his mother. He studied engineering at university in Aberdeen, where he joined the university dramatic society. Afterwards, he studied at the Royal Scottish Academy of Music and Drama in Glasgow.

Career

Stage
Fleet began his career in the RSC, appearing in several plays in the early 1980s. He has since appeared in touring productions of, among others, Habeas Corpus and In the Club, as well as in Festen and Mary Stuart and others in the West End.
He also played Alderman Fitzwarren in Dick Whittington in 2002.

In 2003 he played Kulygin in Anton Chekhov's Three Sisters alongside Kristin Scott Thomas who played Masha.

In 2009 he portrayed Sir Andrew Aguecheek in the RSC Production of Twelfth Night. In 2011 he was in Richard Bean's The Heretic directed by Jeremy Herrin at the Royal Court Theatre in London. Starting in November 2011 he was in the original line-up of The Ladykillers as Major Courtney at the Gielgud Theatre.

Radio
Between 2000 and 2006, Fleet played the painfully upright and decent Captain Brimshaw in Revolting People, a BBC Radio 4 comedy set in pre-revolutionary America. He also appeared in the radio legal sitcom Chambers, which later moved onto television. As of 2005, he has starred as Duncan Stonebridge MP in the topical radio sitcom The Party Line. He also appeared as the Captain on the BBC Radio 7 series The Spaceship. He also plays the part of Sir John Woodstock in the BBC Radio 4 sitcom The Castle and Inspector Lestrade in the first, third and fourth series of The Rivals. Fleet played John Aubrey in the 2008 BBC Radio 4 Woman's Hour production by Nick Warburton of Aubrey's Brief Lives.

Television
In 1999–2001 he was the voice of "Dog" in the children's TV show Dog and Duck.
Probably his most famous role is that of Hugo in The Vicar of Dibley; he appeared in all 20 episodes, broadcast between 1994 and 2007. In 2004 he appeared in an episode of Monarch of the Glen. In 2005 he played a leading role in an episode of the long-running ITV murder mystery series Midsomer Murders. In 2007 he was a guest star in one episode of the sitcom Legit. He appeared as Frederick Dorrit in the BBC's 2008 production of Little Dorrit.
When Fleet appeared on the quiz show School's Out, it was revealed that one of his teachers at Banff Academy had written in his school report that "[James] is the stupidest boy I have ever had to teach, out of all the stupid boys I have ever had to teach," and that he was the only student in his sixth form not to have been made a prefect. Despite his apparent lack of scholastic ability, he still won the show. In 2009, Fleet appeared in a cameo role in the third series of Skins.

Earlier in his career, Fleet was seen in a 1983 episode of Grange Hill as a teacher at the eponymous school's upmarket rival Rodney Bennett. In 1992 he played Paul Morgan in an episode of The Bill 'Runaway'. In 1999 he starred in the sitcom Brotherly Love.

Fleet appeared in Coronation Street in 2010. He played a character called Robbie Sloan, a recently released convict, helping escaped prisoner Tony Gordon plot revenge on his ex-wife Carla Connor. They intend to kidnap and kill her. Sloan lures Connor into her Underworld factory, and holds her at gunpoint. Leaving her tied to a chair with her mouth taped shut, Sloan also lures Hayley Cropper into the hostage situation. Sloan was eventually shot by Gordon during a siege at the factory.

In February 2011, Fleet appeared as George (senior), the father of werewolf George Sands, in Being Human.

In December 2013 the BBC aired one of their major dramas for the Christmas season, Death Comes to Pemberley, a three-part British television drama based on characters created by Jane Austen in her novel Pride and Prejudice. The first episode was broadcast on BBC One at 8.15 pm on Boxing Day 2013. It was based on the best-selling novel by P. D. James, in which the characters of Pride and Prejudice are involved in a new story involving a murder. Fleet played the part of Mr Bennett in the series. In September 2014, Fleet appeared in the BBC Three sitcom Bad Education as Richard, an ex-boyfriend of Rosie Gulliver. He has most recently appeared in an episode of ITVs second series of Plebs, as Stylax's racing patron. In 2013, Fleet was engaged to play Scottish historian, the Reverend Dr. Reginald Wakefield, in seasons 1 and 2 of the Award-winning Starz adaptation of Diana Gabaldon's Outlander, broadcast in 2014–2016.

An April 2021 announcement stated that Fleet would be joining the cast of the second season of All Creatures Great and Small in the role of Colonel Merrick.

Film
Fleet has starred in numerous films. He played the role of Kevin's father in the 2000 cult film Kevin & Perry Go Large. He played the roles of Lefevre in the 2004 film adaptation of Phantom of the Opera, John Dashwood in 1995's Sense and Sensibility, and Lytton Strachey in the 2003 film Al Sur de Granada (South from Granada). In 2014, he played John Constable in the Mike Leigh film Mr Turner. In 2016, he played Sir Reginald DeCourcy in Whit Stillman's Love and Friendship.

Filmography

Film

Television

Radio

Theatre

Personal life
Fleet lives in Sibford Gower, Oxfordshire with his wife, Jane Booker, and their one son.

References

External links 
 

1952 births
Living people
English male film actors
English male radio actors
English male stage actors
English male television actors
People from Wolverhampton
English people of Scottish descent
Actors from Staffordshire
Anglo-Scots
Alumni of the Royal Conservatoire of Scotland
Alumni of the University of Aberdeen
English male Shakespearean actors
Royal Shakespeare Company members
People from Bilston
20th-century English male actors
21st-century English male actors
People from the West Midlands (region)
People from Aberdeenshire
People educated at Banff Academy